Oscar Saul (December 26, 1912, New York City – May 23, 1994, Los Angeles) was an American screenwriter. Saul wrote or collaborated on the screenplays for numerous movies from the 1940s through to the early 1980s. His best-known work was on the screen adaptation of Tennessee Williams' A Streetcar Named Desire.'

Career

Saul co-wrote plays, including The Revolt of the Beavers, first produced at the Federal Theatre Project in 1937, and Medicine Show, which appeared on Broadway in 1940. He wrote one novel The Dark Side of Love, in 1974. He began screenwriting in 1944 with co-writing the screenplay for Strange Affair from his own short story Stalk the Hunter and Cary Grant's Once Upon a Time.

Selected filmography
As writer, unless otherwise specified.

Once Upon a Time (1944)
Road House (1948; story)
The Dark Past (1948; adaptation)
The Lady Gambles (1949; story)
Once More, My Darling (1949; additional dialogue)
Woman in Hiding (1950)
The Secret of Convict Lake (1951)
A Streetcar Named Desire (1951; adaptation of the play)
Thunder on the Hill (1952)
Affair in Trinidad (1952)
Let's Do It Again (1953; producer)
The Joker Is Wild (1957)
The Helen Morgan Story (1957)
The Naked Maja (1958; story)
The Second Time Around (1961)
Major Dundee (1965)
The Silencers (1966)
Murderers' Row (1966) (uncredited)
The Strange Affair (1968)
Man and Boy (1971)
Los Amigos (1972)
A Streetcar Named Desire (1984)

References

External links

1912 births
1994 deaths
Writers from New York City